Tin(IV) chloride, also known as tin tetrachloride or stannic chloride, is an inorganic compound with the formula SnCl4. It is a colorless hygroscopic liquid, which fumes on contact with air. It is used as a precursor to other tin compounds. It was first discovered by Andreas Libavius (1550–1616) and was known as spiritus fumans libavii.

Preparation
 Sn + 2 Cl2 → SnCl4

Structure
Anhydrous tin(IV) chloride solidifies at −33 °C to give monoclinic crystals with the P21/c space group. It is isostructural with SnBr4. The molecules adopt near-perfect tetrahedral symmetry with average Sn–Cl distances of 227.9(3) pm.

Reactions
Tin(IV) chloride is well known as a Lewis acid. Thus it forms hydrates. The pentahydrate SnCl4·5H2O was formerly known as butter of tin. They all consist of [SnCl4(H2O)2] molecules together with varying amounts of water of crystallization. The additional water molecules link together the molecules of [SnCl4(H2O)2] through hydrogen bonds. Although the pentahydrate is the most common hydrate, lower hydrates have also been characterised.

Aside from water, other Lewis bases form adducts with SnCl4. These include ammonia and organophosphines. The complex [SnCl6]2− is formed with hydrochloric acid making hexachlorostannic acid.

Applications

Precursor to organotin compounds
Anhydrous tin(IV) chloride is a major precursor in organotin chemistry. Upon treatment with Grignard reagents, tin(IV) chloride gives tetraalkyltin compounds:
SnCl4  +  4 RMgCl   →   SnR4 +  4 MgCl2
Anhydrous tin(IV) chloride reacts with tetraorganotin compounds in redistribution reactions:
SnCl4 +  SnR4   →   2 SnCl2R2
These organotin halides are useful precursors to catalysts (e.g., dibutyltin dilaurate) and polymer stabilizers.

Organic synthesis
SnCl4 is used in Friedel-Crafts reactions as a Lewis acid catalyst. For example, the acetylation of thiophene to give 2-acetylthiophene is promoted by tin(IV) chloride. Similarly, tin(IV) chloride is useful for the nitrations.

Safety
Stannic chloride was used as a chemical weapon in World War I, as it formed an irritating (but non-deadly) dense smoke on contact with air: it was substituted for by a mixture of silicon tetrachloride and titanium tetrachloride near the end of the war due to shortages of tin.

References

External links

International Chemical Safety Card 0953
Use in glass industry (commercial link)

Chlorides
Tin(IV) compounds
Metal halides